Dapi or DAPI may refer to:

 Dapi, Yunlin, Taiwan, a rural township
 Dapi Lake, former name of Jinshi Lake, Kaohsiung, Taiwan
 Dapi Lake, former name of Meihua Lake, Yilan County, Taiwan
 DAPI, a fluorescent stain

See also
 Diarylpyrimidines (DAPY), a class of molecules